This page will show the progress of Carlisle United F.C.'s campaign in the 2011–12 football season. This season they compete in the third tier of English football, League One.

League table

Squad statistics

Appearances and goals

|}

Top scorers

Disciplinary record

Results

Pre-Season Friendlies

League One

FA Cup

League Cup

Football League Trophy

Transfers

Awards

References 

Carlisle United F.C. seasons
Carlisle United